John George Anderson was a Canadian Anglican bishop in the 20th century.

Anderson was born in Orkney, Saskatchewan, Canada on 23 March 1866. He was educated at St. John's College, University of Manitoba.

Anderson ordained in 1889 after which he was a Church Mission Society (CMS) missionary at Long Sault and then Vicar of St Peter's Manitoba. From 1899 to 1909 he was Rural Dean of Lisgar. In 1909 he became Bishop of Moosonee, a post he held until 1943, for the last three years of which he was also Metropolitan of Ontario. He died on 15 June 1943.

References

1866 births
University of Manitoba alumni
Anglican bishops of Moosonee
20th-century Anglican Church of Canada bishops
Metropolitans of Ontario
20th-century Anglican archbishops
1943 deaths